"You Ain't Got Nuthin" is a song by American rapper Lil Wayne, released as the first promotional single from his sixth studio album, Tha Carter III (2008). The song, produced by The Alchemist, with additional production from Deezle, features guest appearances from fellow American rappers Juelz Santana and Fabolous. Although the song was not released as an official single, it was released as a promotional recording to radio stations and peaked at number 81 on the US Billboard Hot 100.

Background 
The song was originally intended for The Alchemist's 2009 album, Chemical Warfare.  In late 2007, an unfinished version of the song leaked online with the same verse from Fabolous and a verse from rapper Cassidy.

Charts

References

2008 songs
2008 singles
Lil Wayne songs
Fabolous songs
Juelz Santana songs
Songs written by Lil Wayne
Songs written by Fabolous
Song recordings produced by the Alchemist (musician)
Gangsta rap songs
Songs written by Juelz Santana
Songs written by The Alchemist (musician)